{{safesubst:#invoke:RfD|||month = March
|day = 15
|year = 2023
|time = 17:26
|timestamp = 20230315172637

|content=
REDIRECT Khan Mughals

}}